Justin Parker is an English songwriter and record producer best known for his work with female singer-songwriters such as Lana Del Rey, Bat for Lashes, and Banks.

Career
Parker began writing music when he was 17, but his career breakthrough came when he started working with Lana Del Rey in February 2011. Together they wrote "Video Games", the song that would launch both of their careers and would lead Parker to win his first Ivor Novello Award for Best Contemporary Song. Although label executives were unimpressed with the song, it became a viral hit after Del Rey posted the song online with an accompanying lo-fi video which led to Fearne Cotton playing the song on BBC Radio 1; "Video Games" also received critical acclaim and commercial success, charting at number 9 in the United Kingdom and number 91 in the United States. Off the back of the success of "Video Games", Del Rey asked Parker to work in collaboration with her on her first major studio album. The pair wrote twelve songs together, five of which can be heard on Born to Die. The creative relationship continued into 2012, and led to the birth of another iconic ballad, "Ride", which features on Del Rey's Paradise.

Also in 2012, Parker co-wrote the lead single "Laura" for Bat for Lashes' third album, The Haunted Man, for which he won an Ivor Novello Award for Best Song Musically and Lyrically. On the experience of writing with Parker, Natasha Kahn of Bat for Lashes said that "the actual process...only took two or three hours" and that in his creative care she was eager for him to take her away from her "more subversive ways of writing music and give me some structure and teach me something about traditional chord progression". simplicity of his collaboration with Del Rey can also be heard on "Laura". Parker also wrote the song "I Know You Care" for Ellie Goulding's second album, Halcyon. He was reported in 2012 to be working with Lissie and Eliza Doolittle on future projects.

Justin then went on to co write "Stay" with Mikky Ekko and recorded by Barbadian singer Rihanna for her seventh studio album, Unapologetic (2012). It features guest vocals by Mikky Ekko, and was released as the second single from the album on 7 January 2013. The song reached the top five of twenty-four countries worldwide including number four in the UK and number three on the US Billboard Hot 100, becoming Rihanna's twenty-fourth top ten on the latter chart, thus passing Whitney Houston's tally of 23 top ten songs.[112] Furthermore, it reached number one in Canada, Czech Republic and Denmark, while also topping the US Pop Songs chart. In interview, Mikky Ekko said of Parker's understanding of songs that 'he really knows how to create a really interesting dynamic with chords that keeps you pleasantly surprised...Justin knows how to give people access to these really heartbreaking chords, and he understands how to push and pull really well with the chords. He knows how to put hurt in the chords'.

Discography
Lana Del Rey
"Video Games"
"Born to Die"
"National Anthem"
"Carmen"
"Radio" (also additional producer)
"Ride"
"Burning Desire"
"Beautiful People Beautiful Problems"
Bat for Lashes
"Laura"
Ellie Goulding
"I Know You Care" (also producer)
Rihanna featuring Mikky Ekko
"Stay" (also producer)
Lissie
"Cold Fish"
Kristina Train
"Lose You Tonight"
Darren Hayes
"Not Even Close" (producer, engineer, and mixer)
Fallulah
"13th Cigarette" (also producer and engineer)
Dua Lipa
"That Kind Of Woman" (composer, writer, producer)
Sander van Doorn featuring Mayaeni
"Nothing Inside"
Keith Urban
"Shame"
Icona Pop
"Just Another Night" (also producer)
Sia
"Straight for the Knife"
Joji
"Run" (also producer)
"Before the Day Is Over"
Banks
"You Should Know Where I'm Coming From" (also producer)
Skrillex
"Stranger"
Luke Sital-Singh
"Lilywhite"
Mikky Ekko
"Comatose" (also producer)
Seal
"Do You Ever"
Linkin Park
"Invisible"

Awards

References

Ivor Novello Award winners
English record producers
British record producers
English songwriters
British songwriters
People from Lincoln, England
Date of birth missing (living people)
Living people
Year of birth missing (living people)